Artyom Albertovich Galimov (born September 8, 1999) is a Russian ice hockey centre who plays for Ak Bars Kazan in the KHL. He was drafted by the Anaheim Ducks in the 5th round of the 2020 NHL Entry Draft with the 129th overall pick.

International play

 

 

Galimov first represented Russia after he was selected to the Russian team for the 2019 World Junior Championships in Vancouver, Canada. He ended the tournament with 3 points in 7 games, helping Russia claim the Bronze medal against Switzerland on January 6, 2019.

Career statistics

Regular season and playoffs

International

References

External links
 

1999 births
Living people
Ak Bars Kazan players
Anaheim Ducks draft picks
Bars Kazan players
Sportspeople from Samara, Russia
Russian ice hockey centres